Aliqoli Khan ( d. 1667) was a Safavid official, gholam, and high-ranking military commander of Georgian origin, who served during the reign of three consecutive Safavid kings (shahs); Safi (r. 1629–1642), Abbas II (r. 1642–1666) and Suleiman I (r. 1666–1694)

A member of the Saakadze clan, he was a son of Bijan Beg and a brother to Rostam Khan (d. 1644) and Isa Khan (d. 1654). Known for his "remarkable career", which spanned some fifty years, Aliqoli Beg, the future khan, held the high posts of chancellor/chief justice (divanbegi), commander-in-chief (sepahsalar-e Iran) and governor (beglarbeg) of the Azerbaijan Province. 

In 1654, Aliqoli Khan fell out of favor with then incumbent king Abbas II. Known for being the most capable Safavid ruler after his great-grandfather Abbas I (r. 1588–1629), Abbas II effectively tackled many issues that had risen as a result of Safi's reign, including in the military administration. Following complaints by soldiers, Aliqoli Khan's conduct was examined by Abbas II; as a result, he was fired on the spot. Later, during the reign of Abbas II's son and successor Suleiman I, Aliqoli Khan was rehabilitated, and Suleiman I reappointed him as the sepahsalar-e Iran.

According to the French traveller Jean Chardin, Aliqoli Khan was the de facto ruler of the Safavid Empire by the time of his death in 1667. He was married to a daughter of Imam-Quli Khan.

Sources
 
  
 
 

1667 deaths
Shia Muslims from Georgia (country)
Iranian people of Georgian descent
Safavid governors of Azerbaijan
Commanders-in-chief of Safavid Iran
Nobility of Georgia (country)
Safavid ghilman
Year of birth missing
17th-century people of Safavid Iran